Abacetus leucotelus is a species of ground beetle in the subfamily Pterostichinae. It was described by Henry Walter Bates in 1873.

References

leucotelus
Beetles described in 1873